Myron B. Williams (c. 1817December 7, 1884) was an American lawyer, Democratic politician, and Wisconsin pioneer.  He was important in the establishment and early development of Watertown, Wisconsin, and represented Jefferson County in the Wisconsin State Senate during the 1st and 2nd legislatures (1848, 1849).

Biography
Myron Williams settled at Watertown, Wisconsin, sometime in the 1840s, and was described as the second practicing lawyer in the village.  In 1848, in the first election for state officers after Wisconsin was admitted to the Union, Williams was elected to represent Jefferson County in the Wisconsin State Senate.  Over the next 30 years, he would serve as a county supervisor, city councilmember, school board member, postmaster, mayor, and district attorney in Jefferson County.

He moved to Indiana in the mid-1870s, where Governor James D. Williams appointed him Judge of the Marion County Superior Court in 1877, when an additional court was instituted by the legislature. Williams served as the 1882 President of the Indianapolis Bar Association. He died in Indianapolis, Indiana, at the age of 67, from inflammation of the bowels following a brief illness.

References

|-

Wisconsin postmasters
Mayors of places in Wisconsin
Politicians from Watertown, Wisconsin
School board members in Wisconsin
Wisconsin city council members
Wisconsin lawyers
Democratic Party Wisconsin state senators
Year of birth missing
1884 deaths
1810s births
19th-century American politicians
19th-century American lawyers